Glenshesk (Irish: Gleann Seisce) is one of the nine Glens of Antrim in County Antrim, Northern Ireland. It was shaped by glacial erosion. The glen lies on the eastern side of Knocklayde mountain and flows out to the sea at Ballycastle.

At the foot of the glen is the ruins of the Friary of Bunamargy built in 1485. A number of battles occurred in the valleys of the glen and a number of standing stones mark the burial places of people killed in battle.

External links
Glens of Antrim Historical Society

Glens of County Antrim
Northern Ireland coast and countryside